Spodnje Jablane is a village in the Municipality of Kidričevo in northeastern Slovenia. Traditionally the area is part of the Styria region. It is now included with the rest of the municipality in the Drava Statistical Region.

References

External links
Spodnje Jablane on Geopedia

Populated places in the Municipality of Kidričevo